Welliton Silva de Azevedo Matheus (born 14 July 2000), simply known as Welliton, is a Brazilian footballer who plays as a forward for Red Bull Bragantino.

Club career
Born in Rio de Janeiro, Welliton joined Corinthians' youth setup in 2015, from Vasco da Gama. On 3 July 2019, after being rarely used in the under-20 squad, he terminated his contract and joined Oeste.

Welliton made his first team debut for Oeste on 31 August 2019, coming on as a late substitute for Bruno Lopes in a 0–0 Série B home draw against Sport Recife. He featured sparingly for the side in the following two years, suffering two relegations during the 2020 season.

On 8 March 2021, Welliton joined Red Bull Bragantino and was initially assigned to reserve team Red Bull Brasil. He made his first team debut for Braga on 20 March of the following year, replacing Helinho in a 1–1 Campeonato Paulista home draw against Palmeiras.

Career statistics

References

External links
Red Bull Bragantino profile 

2000 births
Living people
Footballers from Rio de Janeiro (city)
Brazilian footballers
Association football forwards
Campeonato Brasileiro Série A players
Campeonato Brasileiro Série B players
Oeste Futebol Clube players
Red Bull Brasil players
Red Bull Bragantino players